was a Japanese statesman, courtier, and politician of the Nara period. He was the second son of the founder of the Shikike branch of the Fujiwara, Fujiwara no Umakai. He was the maternal grandfather of the emperors Heizei and Saga.

Early life 
In the year 740, after the death of their father Umakai in 737, Sukunamaro's brother Fujiwara no Hirotsugu led a rebellion. Sukunamaro was implicated and exiled to Izu Province. In 742 he was forgiven, and appointed to the position of shō-hanji.

Afterwards, he moved between a number of positions, including several as a regional administrator, but was unable to produce any spectacular results. In addition, the Shikike branch was in steep decline compared to the Nanke and Hokke branches of the family, and Sukunamaro remained in obscurity. In 762, Fujiwara no Nakamaro was at the peak of his success, and while his three sons were promoted to sangi, the 47-year-old Sukunamaro was resigned to his rank of ju go-i no ge. Sukunamaro conspired with Ōtomo no Yakamochi, Saeki no Imaemishi, and Isonokami no Yakatsugu in a plot to assassinate Nakamaro, but the plan was discovered. In 763, the four were arrested, but Sukunamaro insisted that he had acted alone. Convicted of a crime against the Imperial family, he was stripped of his position and his family name.

Rise to power 

In 764, Fujiwara no Nakamaro incited a rebellion, and Sukunamaro, in response to an Imperial decree, gathered several hundred soldiers and assisted in putting it down. Along with Isonokami no Yakatsugu, who had become sangi, Sukunamaro was now counted among the powerful as a kugyō.

In 770 he was promoted to sangi, and Empress Kōken died shortly thereafter. That year, Sukunamaro changed his name to Yoshitsugu. In 771 the sadaijin Nagate died, and Yoshitsugu's support of Kōnin left him as the central figure of the Fujiwara clan. This made him the second most powerful person in the daijō-kan, after the udaijin Ōnakatomi no Kiyomaro.

He had many daughters, but few sons, and so his line ended when his son Takumi was killed by bandits in Nagaoka-kyō.

Genealogy 

Father: Fujiwara no Umakai
Mother: Ishikawa no Kunimina no Ōtoji (? unclear)
Wife: Abe no Komina
 Daughter: Fujiwara no Otomuro (760–790): Wife of Emperor Kanmu. Mother of Emperors Heizei and Saga.
Wife: from the Tatehara family
Unknown mother: 
 Son: 
 Daughter: Wife of 
 Daughter: Wife of Fujiwara no Ieyori
 Daughter: Wife of Fujiwara no Nagate
 Daughter: Fujiwara no Moroane (?–786), wife of Fujiwara no Momokawa, mother of

References 

Fujiwara clan
716 births
777 deaths
People of Nara-period Japan